The panniculus (often incorrectly referred to as pannus) is a dense layer of fatty tissue consisting of excess subcutaneous fat within the lower abdominal region. Panniculi can form after rapid weight loss, as seen with strict exercise plans—in this case, the abdominal fat is successfully reduced, but excess skin is left behind which hangs loosely over the area. It can be a result of obesity and can be mistaken for a tumor or hernia. Abdominal panniculus can be removed during abdominal panniculectomy, a type of abdominoplasty.  A panniculus can also be the result of loose tissues after pregnancy or massive weight loss.

See also
 Intertrigo
 Panniculus adiposus
 Panniculus carnosus
 Weber–Christian disease

References

Skin anatomy